John Todd Dootson (June 11, 1914 – August 1, 1985) was an American politician in the state of Washington. He served in the Washington House of Representatives for the 38th district.

References

1985 deaths
1914 births
Democratic Party members of the Washington House of Representatives
People from Pasadena, California
20th-century American politicians